Tanya Khovanova (Russian: Татьяна Гелиевна Хованова, also spelled Tatyana Hovanova; born 25 January 1959) is a Soviet-American mathematician who became the second female gold medalist at the International Mathematical Olympiads. She is a lecturer in mathematics at the Massachusetts Institute of Technology.

Education 
As a high school student, Khovanova became a member of the Soviet team for the International Mathematical Olympiad (IMO). In the summer of 1975, Valery Senderov gave the team a list of difficult mathematical problems used in the entrance exams of Moscow State University to discriminate against Soviet Jews, a topic she later wrote about. Khovanova won the silver medal at the 1975 IMO, and a gold medal at the 1976 Olympiad. Her finish at the 1976 Olympiad was second among all competitors, the highest achievement for female students until 1984, when Karin Gröger from East Germany tied for the first place.

Khovanova graduated with honors from Moscow State University (MSU) with a master's degree in mathematics in 1981. She completed her Ph.D. at MSU in 1988 with Israel Gelfand as her doctoral advisor.

Career 
Khovanova left the Soviet Union in 1990, and worked for several years in Israel and the US as a postdoctoral researcher. However, she stopped working as a researcher to raise her children, and then worked in the telecommunications and military contracting industry, before returning to academia as a lecturer at MIT.

Khovanova has been a mathematics competition coach at the Advanced Math and Science Academy Charter School in Marlborough, Massachusetts. In 2010, she helped found the MIT PRIMES program for after school mentoring of local high school students, and she continues to serve as its head mentor. She is also head mentor for mathematics of the Research Science Institute, a summer research program for high school students at MIT.

Research 
In Khovanova's earlier mathematical research, she studied representation theory, the theory of integrable systems, quantum group theory, and superstring theory. Her later work explores combinatorics and recreational mathematics.

Online activities
In the mid-1990s Khovanova created a website called Number Gossip, about the special properties of individual numbers. In 2007, she created a mathematics blog, centered on mathematical puzzles and problem solving.

Personal life 
When Khovanova emigrated to Boston, she did not know how to drive. A friend gave her a copy of The Boston Driver's Handbook which she studied to learn tips before learning years later that the book was intended to be humorous. She has two sons; her first was born in the Soviet Union.

Recognition
An essay about Khovanova, “To Count the Natural Numbers,” by Emily Jia, won the 2016 Essay Contest of the Association for Women in Mathematics.

Selected works
Two of Khovanova's papers were included in the annual Best Writing on Mathematics volumes, in 2014 and 2016 respectively.

References

External links
 
 

1959 births
Living people
Mathematicians from Moscow
21st-century American mathematicians
Soviet emigrants to the United States
American women mathematicians
Soviet women mathematicians
Soviet mathematicians
20th-century women mathematicians
21st-century women mathematicians
Moscow State University alumni
Expatriate academics in the United States
International Mathematical Olympiad participants
Science bloggers
Russian bloggers
American women bloggers
American bloggers
Russian women bloggers
20th-century American mathematicians
20th-century Russian mathematicians
Massachusetts Institute of Technology School of Science faculty
20th-century American women
21st-century American women
20th-century Russian women